Les Dudek is American guitarist Les Dudek's 1976 self-titled solo debut album.

Track listing

Influence
Steve Miller covered "What a Sacrifice" on his album Book of Dreams as "Sacrifice", which included Dudek and James Curly Cooke in the recording.

His early releases influenced by the Southern rock style of the Allman Brothers Band - slide guitar and dual drummers on a few tracks. Dudek was one of the replacement considerations after the death of Duane Allman. He had uncredited contributions to "Ramblin' Man" and "Jessica" and was part of the recording of Brothers and Sisters.

Influence from his work with Boz Scaggs adds a flair of funky jazz.

Personnel and production
Les Dudek : lead vocals and guitars, backing vocals on track 5
Jeff Porcaro : drums
Gerald Johnson : bass on tracks 1, 6, and 7
David Paich : piano, organ, Moog on track 4, Rhodes piano on track 8
Chuck Rainey : bass on tracks 5 and 8
Jim Hughart : bass on track 2
David Hungate : bass on tracks 3 and 4
Tom Scott : lyricon on track 3
David Foster : Rhodes piano on track 8
Mailto Correa : congas on track 8
Glen Cronchite : percussion on track 8
Boz Scaggs : backing vocals on track 5; record producer
Maxine Green, Pepper Swenson, Jeri Stevens : backing vocals on tracks 1 and 6
Carolyn Willis, Myrna Matthews, Rebecca Louis : backing vocals on tracks 4 and 8
Recorded at Davlen Sound Studios, N. Hollywood, CA
Engineered by Leonard Kovner
Mixed by Tom Knox
Additional Recording at Columbia Recording Studios, San Francisco, CA
Engineered by Roy Segal, Glen Kolotkin and staff
Mixed by Doug Sax
Remastered in 2007 at Sound Performance by Andrew Thompson

1976 debut albums
Les Dudek albums
Columbia Records albums
Albums produced by Boz Scaggs